Lois Weldon Bowlin (December 10, 1940 – December 8, 2019) was a Major League Baseball third baseman. Nicknamed "Hoss", he was signed by the St. Louis Cardinals as an amateur free agent in 1959, and acquired by the Kansas City Athletics in August 1961. He started two games for the A's in 1967.

Both games Bowlin appeared in were on the road against the California Angels at Anaheim Stadium (September 16 and 17). He had five at bats, (with one hit), because Sal Bando pinch-hit for him and replaced him at third in both games. Bowlin's one hit, a single to right, came against pitcher Jack Hamilton, who earlier in the season had hit Red Sox All-Star Tony Conigliaro in the face with a fastball.

In his thirteen innings on the field, Bowlin recorded four assists and made no errors.

In 1971, he was the manager of the Wisconsin-Rapids, guiding future major leaguers Glen Borgman, Bill Campbell and Dave McKay.

Bowlin directed the University of West Alabama  baseball program for 14 years, racking up over 300 wins, including 90 Gulf South Conference wins. In 2002, he was inducted into the UWA Athletic Hall of Fame.

Bowlin died on December 8, 2019.

References

External links

1940 births
2019 deaths
Kansas City Athletics players
Major League Baseball third basemen
Baseball players from Arkansas
Minor league baseball managers
Hobbs Cardinals players
Memphis Chickasaws players
Dothan Cardinals players
Portsmouth-Norfolk Tides players
Lancaster Red Roses players
Billings Mustangs players
Lewiston Broncs players
Birmingham Barons players
Vancouver Mounties players
Mobile A's players
Birmingham A's players
Charlotte Hornets (baseball) players
Evansville Triplets players
Wisconsin Rapids Twins players
Arkansas State Red Wolves baseball players